Philip "Phil" Wagenheim (February 2, 1915 – April 1989) was a Boston mobster and a close associate of Llario "Larry Baione" Zannino and Whitey Bulger. Based in the neighborhood of Jamaica Plain, he was a key contact between the New York and Boston underworld between the 1960s until his death from natural causes in April 1989. 

In November 1966, he was present at Ralph Lamattina's Nite Lite Café with Joseph Lamattina and Larry Biona when two members of Joe "the Animal" Barboza's "crew", Tash Bratsos and Tommy DePrisco, were murdered (the two had previously been extorting money from local residents to raise bail for Barboza).

Further reading
Lehr, Dick and Gerard O'Neill. Black Mass: The Irish Mob, the Boston FBI and a Devil's Deal. New York: Public Affairs, 2000.  
Mulvihill, Donald J., Melvin Marvin Tumin and Lynn A. Curtis. Crimes of Violence: A Staff Report Submitted to the National Commission on the Causes and Prevention of Violence. New York: United States National Commission on the Causes and Prevention of Violence, 1969. 
United States Congress. Senate. Select Committee on Small Business. Criminal Redistribution Systems and Their Economic Impact on Small Business:Hearings Before the Select Committee on Small Business. Washington, D.C., 1973.

External links
WhiteyWorld.com - Phil Waggenheim

 

1915 births
1989 deaths
American gangsters
Gangsters from Boston
People from Jamaica Plain
Patriarca crime family